Anthodes is a monotypic moth genus of the family Noctuidae. Its only species, Anthodes acynodonta, is found in Uruguay. Both the genus and species were first described by Paul Dognin in 1914.

References

External links
Original description: Hétérocères nouveaux de l'Amérique du Sud:18 

Acronictinae
Noctuoidea genera
Monotypic moth genera